Mohamed Hefzy (born 13 March 1975), is an Egyptian film producer and screenwriter. One of the leading film producers in Middle East and Africa, Screen International named him as the only Arab among 30 future leaders in film production in 2013. In 2016, Hefzy was chosen by Variety on top of a list of "Ten names you need to know in the Arab Film Industry" and included him in the Variety 500.

Personal life
He was born on 13 March 1975 in Cairo, Egypt. Before entering cinema, he studied metallurgical engineering in London.

Career
He is the founder of the production company 'Film Clinic' located in Egypt established in 2005. Through the company, he offered workshops and training programs for Arabian and African film people cooperating with international organizations and institutes. In 2010, he became one of the jury members at the Cairo International Film Festival. Then in 2011, he became a jury member of Abu Dhabi Film Festival and then became a jury member at the Venice International Film Festival in 2018. From 2015 to 2017, Hefzy worked as the director of the Ismailia International Film Festival for Documentaries and Shorts, as well as on the advisory board of Cairo International Film Festival. Since 2013, he has been a board member of the Egyptian Chamber of Cinema. 

In 2016, he produced the film Clash. The film was later selected as the opening film of the 'Un Certain Regard' section of Cannes International Film Festival. In 2018, he worked as the co-producer of the film Yomeddine. The film also selected to screen at Cannes in the official competition. In 2020, he produced the film Luxor which competed at the World Dramatic Competition at Sundance Film Festival. In the meantime, his co-production, Souad, entered official selection at the first virtual edition of Cannes Film Festival, which became his third entry into Cannes. 

In March 2018, he became the youngest president in the history of the Cairo International Film Festival, when Hefzy was assigned by the minister of culture. In the same year, he won the Arab Cinema Center Arab Cinema Personality of the Year presented by the Hollywood Reporter for his contribution to the world cinema. Later in June 2019, he was invited as a member of the Academy Of Motions Pictures Arts And Sciences in the "Producers" branch.

Hefzy was selected as a jury member for the 2022 International Emmy Awards.

Partial filmography

References

External links
 

1975 births
Living people
Egyptian film producers